Edward Brian Pope (29 June 1911 – 19 August 2011) was an international rugby union scrum-half who played club rugby for Oxford University and Blackheath. Pope played international rugby for England and invitational rugby for the Barbarians.

Bibliography

References

1911 births
2011 deaths
English rugby union players
England international rugby union players
People from Chipping Barnet
Rugby union scrum-halves
Barbarian F.C. players
Cambridge University R.U.F.C. players
Blackheath F.C. players
People educated at Uppingham School
Alumni of Clare College, Cambridge
English centenarians
Men centenarians
Rugby union players from Greater London